Reece Kenneth Willcox (born March 20, 1994) is a Canadian professional ice hockey defenseman who is currently playing with the HC Pustertal Wölfe in the ICE Hockey League (ICEHL). He was drafted in the fifth round of the 2012 NHL Entry Draft by the Philadelphia Flyers.

Early life
Willcox was born on March 20, 1994, in Surrey, British Columbia, Canada to parents Darryl and Barb Wilcox. His younger brother Rhett also plays ice hockey and was drafted by the Western Hockey League's Portland Winterhawks in 2011.

Playing career
Willcox signed a three-year entry-level contract with the Philadelphia Flyers on March 21, 2016. Willcox played for the Lehigh Valley Phantoms of the American Hockey League (AHL) for the duration of his tenure within the Flyers organization.

Leaving as a free agent after parts of five seasons with the Flyers, Willcox opted to continue his career by agreeing to a contract with the Florida Everblades of the ECHL on January 5, 2021. After making 5 appearances with the Everblades into the pandemic delayed 2020–21 season, Willcox was signed to a professional tryout contract to attend the Hershey Bears training camp on January 20, 2021. He remained with the Bears for the duration of the season, registering 5 assists through 27 regular season games.

On July 27, 2021, Wilcox left the AHL as a free agent and signed his first contract abroad in joining Italian club, HC Pustertal Wölfe, for their debut season in the ICE Hockey League.

Career statistics

References

External links

1994 births
Living people
Canadian ice hockey defencemen
Cornell Big Red men's ice hockey players
Florida Everblades players
Hershey Bears players
Ice hockey people from British Columbia
Merritt Centennials players
Lehigh Valley Phantoms players
Philadelphia Flyers draft picks
Reading Royals players
Sportspeople from Surrey, British Columbia